Ola J. Ordal (August 2, 1870 – December 27, 1936) was an American teacher, pastor, and the fifth president of Pacific Lutheran College.

Ordal received his education in the grammar schools of South Dakota, later attending the Lutheran Normal School at Sioux Falls, South Dakota.  He then taught in the public school of Story County, Iowa.

He received his A.B. degree from Luther College in 1898 and three years later completed his studies at Luther Seminary, Saint Paul, Minnesota.  His first pastorate was at New Whatcom, now Bellingham, Washington.  From there he moved to Red Wing Minnesota.

Prior to becoming president at Pacific Lutheran College (PLC), he served as pastor of Our Saviours’ Lutheran Church in Tacoma.  He was actively connected with school work the greater part of his ministry.  He was a member of the board of trustees for the Ladies’ Seminary at Red Wing, Minnesota; a longtime member of the board of trustees at Pacific Lutheran Academy in Parkland and later a member of the board of trustees for Pacific Lutheran College.  For three years, he was the president of the National Association of Young People’s Societies in the former Norwegian Synod of the American Evangelical Lutheran Church.

During president Ordal’s tenure at PLC, collegiate status was achieved and an elaborate committee system was established, with nine committees for the ten full-time faculty members.  A system of rules governing appointments, salaries and promotions were also established and the Normal department was accredited by the state.

The first endowment drive was launched during Ordal’s time with a goal of raising $250,000 and by 1927 that goal was reached.

With the successful endowment drive behind him, collegiate status achieved, and normal department accreditation, Ola. J. Ordal resigned in January 1928 and accepted a call to  Our Saviour’s Lutheran Church in Bellingham, Washington.

Ordal Hall built was built in 1967 and named to honor the fifth president of Pacific Lutheran University.

References

1870 births
1936 deaths
Heads of universities and colleges in the United States
Pacific Lutheran University people
20th-century American Lutheran clergy
Luther College (Iowa) alumni
Luther Seminary alumni